Beroe Hill (Halm Beroe \'h&lm be-'ro-e\) is a hill of 400 m in the southwest extremity of Gleaner Heights, Livingston Island, West Antarctica.  It is surmounting Perunika Glacier to the south and Saedinenie Snowfield to the northwest.  The hill was named after the ancient Thracian town of Beroe, ancestor of the present city of Stara Zagora.

Location

Bulgarian mapping in 2005, 2009 and 2017 from the Tangra 2004/05 topographic survey.

Maps
 L.L. Ivanov et al. Antarctica: Livingston Island and Greenwich Island, South Shetland Islands. Scale 1:100000 topographic map. Sofia: Antarctic Place-names Commission of Bulgaria, 2005.
 L.L. Ivanov. Antarctica: Livingston Island and Greenwich, Robert, Snow and Smith Islands. Scale 1:120000 topographic map.  Troyan: Manfred Wörner Foundation, 2009.

References
 Beroe Hill. SCAR Composite Gazetteer of Antarctica
 Bulgarian Antarctic Gazetteer. Antarctic Place-names Commission. (details in Bulgarian, basic data in English)

External links
 Beroe Hill. Copernix satellite image

Hills of Livingston Island
Stara Zagora